The Yale Bulldogs represented Yale University in ECAC women's ice hockey. The Bulldogs will attempt to win the NCAA tournament for the first time in school history.

Offseason

Recruiting

Regular season

Standings

Schedule

Conference record

Roster

References

Yale Bulldogs women's ice hockey seasons
2012–13 NCAA Division I women's hockey season
Yale Bulldogs
Yale Bulldogs